Jean Gol (8 February 1942 – 18 September 1995) was a Belgian politician for the liberal Walloon party Parti Réformateur Libéral (PRL). He was a minister, on several occasions, in the Belgian government, including service as Deputy Prime Minister.

Early life

His Jewish parents, Stanislas Gol (1908–1976), born in Warsaw, and Léa Karny (1911–2001), born in Liège from parents born in present-day Lithuania (then Russian Empire), were both medical doctors with diplomas from the University of Liège. After the Nazi invasion of Belgium in 1940, the Karny family and their stepsons took refuge in England, via France, Algeria, Morocco and Portugal. Stanislas Gol enlisted in the Belgian Army in the United Kingdom, and Léa gave birth to Jean in exile. The family returned to Belgium in 1945, but Léa's parents, Coussel Karny (1883–1944), and Yocheved Chamech (1886–1944), had gone back to Liège in December 1940, and had been deported to  Auschwitz concentration camp in July 1944, and didn't survive deportation.

After the Second World War, Gol grew up in Belgium and studied law. He obtained a doctorate in law at the University of Liège.

Political career
Then, in 1968, they both split to form the Parti wallon, and Gol was elected on a larger regionalist ticket, the Rassemblement Wallon (Walloon Rally), a few weeks later for the 1968 Belgian general election on 31 March 1968.

Public offices
In 1974, he was Secrétaire d'État à l'Economie régionale wallonne in the government Tindemans II. In 1976, he was one of the co-founders of the Parti des Réformes et des Libertés de Wallonie (PRLW), a merger of the liberal Walloon PLP, and some dissidents of the Rassemblement Wallon. During the governments Martens V-VII, of 17 December 1981 up to 9 May 1988, he was: vice-premier, minister of justice and institutional reform. From 6 January 1985, up to 28 November 1985, Jean Gol replaced Willy De Clercq on the department of foreign trade.

In June 1994, he was elected a member of the European Parliament, and in addition was elected as a member of the Belgian Senate in 1995.

Leadership within Francophone circles

Over a long period he was noted for his ability to empathize with local Walloon and Liégeois leaders from diverse political backgrounds, including with veteran Walloon Socialist André Cools; out of these efforts emerged what became known as the 'Colonster' group, which partly proved to be the catalyst for a strengthening of collective Francophone responses by way of counterweight to the increasing influence of Flemish-based parties in Belgium.

In May 1992, he became president of the PRL, and in 1993, he was one of the architects of the PRL-FDF Federation, in collaboration with Antoinette Spaak.

Contribution to political theory

He re-defined the doctrine of social liberalism, which he had already worked on in 1976.

Jean Gol has voiced his support for Rattachism.

Death

He died of a sudden illness in 1995. He was succeeded as leader of the PRL by his longstanding party colleague Louis Michel.

Honours 
He received the following honorific distinctions

 : Grand Officier of the Order of Leopold
 : Grand Officer of the Legion of Honour
 : Knight Grand Cross of the Order of Merit of the Italian Republic
 : Grand Cross of Order of Isabella the Catholic
 : Grand Cross of the Order of Christ
 : Grand Cross of the Order of the Aztec Eagle
 : Umurinzi Medal

See also
Philippe Wilmès, chef de cabinet from 1975

References

Sources
 Centre Jean Gol
 Liberaal Archief

1942 births
1995 deaths

Walloon people
Walloon movement activists
Belgian Ministers of State
University of Liège alumni
Liberal Reformist Party MEPs
MEPs for Belgium 1994–1999
Jewish Belgian politicians

Knights Grand Cross of the Order of Isabella the Catholic
Knights Grand Cross of the Order of Merit of the Italian Republic
Grand Crosses of the Order of Christ (Portugal)
Grand Officiers of the Légion d'honneur
People from Hammersmith
Belgian people of Polish-Jewish descent
Belgian people in the United Kingdom during World War II